Lesbian, gay, bisexual, transgender (LGBT) persons in Kuwait face challenges not experienced by non-LGBT Kuwaitis. Homosexuality is specifically outlawed. In addition gay people can be prosecuted under the "debauchery" law. LGBT persons are regularly prosecuted by the government and additionally face stigmatization among the broader population.

Law
The penal code contains some general provisions against debauchery and immorality that can be used to punish LGBT people.

 Article 193 of the Penal Code punishes "consensual intercourse between men of full age (from the age of 21)" with a term of imprisonment of up to seven years.
 Article 198 prohibits public immorality.  In 2008, the law was expanded to also outlaw "imitating the appearance of a member of the opposite sex" with fines and or imprisonment. This was ruled unconstitutional in 2022.

In September 2013, it was announced that all Gulf Cooperative Countries had agreed to discuss a proposal to establish some form of, yet unknown, testing in order to ban gay foreigners from entering any of the countries. However, it has been suggested that concern for hosting 2022 FIFA World Cup in Qatar, and fears for controversy in a case that football fans would have been screened, made officials backtrack the plans and insist that it was a mere proposal.

In 2017 Polish Instagram star King Luxy was arrested in Kuwait for allegedly looking too feminine. He spent 2 weeks in custody before he was released.

HIV/AIDS issues

In 1988, the Kuwaiti Ministry of Public Health published a report on HIV infections in Kuwait, especially the person's nationality, marital status and sexual orientation.  In 2004 a United Nations report on HIV in Kuwait found that about six percent of known transmission cases were the result of unprotected sexual contact between men.

In 1992, the National Assembly outlawed the knowing transmission of HIV to another person.

Foreigners found to be infected with AIDS/HIV are deported, but Kuwaiti citizens who are infected are entitled to outpatient medical care, organized by a specialized infectious disease hospital.

LGBT rights movement in Kuwait

No known association or charity exists in Kuwait to campaign for LGBT rights or organize educational and social events for the LGBT community.

In 2007, the Al Arabiya news service reported that a group of Kuwaitis had applied for a permit to form a new association that would stand up for the rights of LGBT Kuwaitis.  All such interest groups or clubs have to be approved by the Ministry of Labor and Social Affairs, which never formally replied.

In July 2019 the group announced that they would again apply for a permit from the ministry in response to a crackdown by the Ministry of commerce on symbols representing homosexuality such as rainbows in shops.

Summary table

See also

Human rights in Kuwait
GCC homosexuality test
LGBT in the Middle East
LGBT rights in Asia

References

Human rights in Kuwait
Kuwait
Kuwait
Kuwait
LGBT in Kuwait